Guido Buffarini Guidi (17 August 1895 – 10 July 1945) was an Italian army officer and politician, executed for war crimes in 1945.

Biography

Buffarini Guidi was born in Pisa in 1895. When Italy entered World War I, he volunteered in an artillery regiment. He was promoted to rank of captain in 1917, and remained on active duty in the Italian Army until 1923 – in the meantime, he earned his bachelor's degree in law from the University of Pisa in March 1920.

After leaving the army, with the rank of lieutenant colonel, he became active in Fascist circles, and joined the National Fascist Party (PNF). A mayor of Pisa in April 1923, Buffarini Guidi headed the local Party hierarchy from 1924 (his notoriety being increased by his career as a lawyer). He rose to become honorary Consul of the MVSN Blackshirts - the voluntary militia after the March on Rome.

In May 1933, he was appointed to be Undersecretary Minister of Interior, and forged an alliance with Galeazzo Ciano - opposing the Party bureaucracy, creating several secret services, and attempting to lessen the effects of Antisemitic legislation passed by the regime. Nevertheless, (and unlike Ciano), on 25 July 1943, Buffarini Guidi voted in favor of Benito Mussolini during Dino Grandi's attempt to have the latter deposed and get Italy to sign a peace with the Allies. As a reward, after Nazi Germany intervened and rescued Mussolini in September, Guido Buffarini Guidi was appointed Minister of the Interior of the new Italian Social Republic (established by Nazis in Northern Italy). Seen as extremely avaricious, he was distrusted even by most of his cabinet colleagues.

Near the end of the Republic's life, in February 1945, Mussolini dismissed Buffarini Guidi from office. After a failed attempt to escape to Switzerland, he was arrested by the partisans on 26 April. He was sentenced to death by an Extraordinary Court of Justice in Milan who found him guilty of war crimes, and was shot on 10 July, having tried (like French collaborator Pierre Laval) and failed to commit suicide while in captivity.

While in prison, Guidi offered to reveal to the Allies compromising letters exchanged between Churchill and Mussolini during the war in exchange for his release; he was unsuccessful.

Appearances in film 

In the 1973 film Massacre in Rome, Guido Guidi is portrayed by Italian actor Guidarino Guidi.

External links 

  at www.geocities.com

1895 births
1945 deaths
Mayors of Pisa
Executed politicians
People of the Italian Social Republic
20th-century Italian lawyers
Italian people convicted of war crimes
Executed Italian people
Italian anti-communists
People executed for war crimes
People executed by Italy by firing squad